Noi, loro, gli altri (stylized in all caps) is the seventh studio album by Italian rapper Marracash, released on 19 November 2021 by Island Records. The album was at the top of the ranking of the 20 best Italian records of the year drawn up by the Rolling Stone Italia.

The album has also been certified double platinum in Italy by FIMI. Almost all the tracks from the album were also certified by FIMI. "Loro", "Pagliaccio", "Io", "Cosplayer", "Dubbi", "Laurea ad honorem" (with Calcutta) and "Nemesi" (with Blanco) were certified Gold, while "Love" (with Gué) and "Crazy Love" were certified Platinum.

Background 
The arrival of a new recording project after Persona was announced in January 2021, on the occasion of the rapper's participation in the Radio Deejay show Say Waaad?. The record is the result of a three-month home isolation.

In November of the same year, the Italian edition of Rolling Stone magazine published an issue focused on Marracash, carrying out an interview with the artist. Inside there are also interventions by other artists such as Gué Pequeno and Elodie who talked about the rapper and in addition the future album is also mentioned, when, however, the title or release date had not been officially announced. 

The release of the album, which took place on November 19, was announced by surprise through his social networks on 17 November 2021.

Description 
As explained by Marracash himself, the title of the album (translated as "Us, them, the others") "tells the moment: we are a fragmented society, divided into teams and factions, each with its own truth. The right to identity is claimed, and in the cases of sexual identity, for example, I find it absolutely right, and at the same time the overview is lost". The album features three covers: "Noi" is the main one, while "Loro" and "Gli Altri" have been made available exclusively in the limited edition LP version. On the first cover, Marracash poses alongside some characters, mostly members of her family, including Elodie and her manager, Paola Zukar; in the second, the rapper is inside the Universal offices in Milan with his staff; in the last cover he finds himself immersed in a crowd turned from behind, in the opposite direction to that of the artist.

Some of the fourteen pieces that make up the disc feature samples, while others feature the participation of various guest artists, however not explicitly accredited on the back. "Pagliaccio" contains a fragment of the lyrical aria "Vesti la giubba" performed by Mario Del Monaco and taken from the opera Pagliacci by Ruggero Leoncavallo. "Love" and "Io" contain samples of Guru Josh's "Infinity" and Vasco Rossi's "Gli angeli", respectively. "Crazy Love" contains the uncredited vocal participation of singers Elodie and Mahmood, "Cosplayer" contains a sampling of "Honeybee" by New Birth and features the uncredited vocal participation by Salmo and Joan Thiele, the latter also present in "Noi". The interlude "Noi, loro, gli altri (Skit)" features the uncredited vocal participation of rapper Fabri Fibra and a sampling of "Maleducato" by Dumbo Gets Mad, "Gli altri (giorni stupidi)" contains samples of the songs "Stupid Days" by Rokas and EDONiCo and "Makes You Fly" by Dumbo Gets Mad and "Dumbo Gets Mad Skit" is taken from the track Misanthropulsar by Dumbo Gets Mad. The final piece "Cliffhanger" contains a fragment from the Ballabile (second scene of Act II of the Aida) by Giuseppe Verdi.

Promotion 
The first single from the disc is "Crazy Love", accompanied by a music video distributed on YouTube to coincide with the release of the song, on 19 November 2021; it shows the rapper and Elodie during a duel to the death.

On February 24, 2022, the rapper made available the video for the third track "Infinity Love". On March 4 it was released the video for the second single "Laurea ad honorem", in collaboration with Calcutta.

Track listing

Charts

Weekly charts

Year-end charts

Certifications

Year-end lists

References 

2021 albums
Alternative hip hop albums
Island Records albums
Marracash albums